Li Xueqin (born 1 March 1975) is a Chinese alpine skier. She competed in three events at the 1992 Winter Olympics.

References

1975 births
Living people
Chinese female alpine skiers
Olympic alpine skiers of China
Alpine skiers at the 1992 Winter Olympics
Skiers from Jilin
Alpine skiers at the 1996 Asian Winter Games
20th-century Chinese women